The Tabernacle of Unity is a small book, first published in July 2006, containing Baháʼu'lláh's Tablet, from the early ʻAkká period, to Mánikc͟hí Ṣáḥib, a prominent Zoroastrian, and a companion Tablet addressed to Mírzá Abu'l-Faḍl, the secretary to Mánikc͟hí Ṣáḥib at that time.

These, together with three shorter inspirational Tablets, offer a glimpse of Baháʼu'lláh's relationship with the followers of Zoroastrianism.

The title of this work is taken from the following passage:

Tablet to Mánikc͟hí Ṣáḥib (Lawh-i-Mánikc͟hí Ṣáḥib)
This Tablet, revealed at the request of Mánikc͟hí Ṣáḥib in pure Persian, consists of 19 paragraphs. It emphasizes the universality of Baháʼu'lláh's prophetic claim, and includes some of the central teachings of the Baháʼí Faith.

Responses to questions of Mánikc͟hí Ṣáḥib from a Tablet to Mírzá Abu'l-Faḍl
This is a lengthy Tablet revealed on 1 July 1882. Among the subjects discussed are:
The nature of creation.
The connection between faith and reason.
The reconciliation of the differences that exist among the laws and ordinances of various religions (Hinduism, the Mahabad Faith, Zoroastrianism, Christianity and Islam).
Their respective claims to exclusivity.
Their differing degrees of eagerness to welcome others into their fold.

Tablet of the Seven Questions (Lawh-i-Haft Pursis͟h)
This Tablet is Baháʼu'lláh's reply to questions asked by Ustád Javán-Mard, an early Baháʼí of Zoroastrian background and ex-student of Mánikc͟hí Ṣáḥib.

The questions are relating to the following subjects:
In what tongue and towards what direction should God be worshipped?
The Faith of God
Opposition
S͟háh Bahrám
The Bridge of Sirát, Paradise and Hell
The soul
The lineage and ancestry of Baháʼu'lláh

Two other tablets
These two short Tablets, each addressed to a believer of Zoroastrian background, are inspirational in nature, calling the believers for deeds, not words.

See also
 Baháʼí Faith and Hinduism
 Baháʼí Faith and Zoroastrianism

References

External links
BWNS: New volume of Baháʼí sacred writings is published
Tablet to Mánikc͟hí Ṣáḥib, a provisional translation with an introduction and a brief outline, by Ramin Neshati.
Baha'u'llah on Hinduism and Zoroastrianism: The Tablet to Mirza Abu'l-Faḍl Concerning the Questions of Manakji Limji Hataria, Introduction and provisional translation by Juan R. I. Cole

Works by Baháʼu'lláh
1882 books
2006 non-fiction books
1882 in religion
2006 in religion
Books published posthumously